The 1921 Oklahoma Sooners football team represented the University of Oklahoma in the 1921 college football season. In their 17th year under head coach Bennie Owen, the Sooners compiled a 5–3 record (2-3 against conference opponents), finished in a tie for seventh place in the Missouri Valley Conference, and outscored their opponents by a combined total of 127 to 102.

No Sooners were recognized as All-Americans, and end Howard Marsh was the only Sooner to receive all-conference honors.

Schedule

References

Oklahoma
Oklahoma Sooners football seasons
Oklahoma Sooners football